Demir Sabanci is a Turkish entrepreneur, venture capitalist, and philanthropist. He is the chairman of Sedes Holding and its subsidiaries. His businesses range from the largest personal care market chain in Turkey, to real estate management and development in New York City.

Sabanci is a third generation member of the Sabanci family. Born in 1971 he is a grandson of Haci Omer Sabanci and the only son of Özdemir Sabancı, who was murdered by a terrorist attack in 1996 at the headquarters of Sabancı Holding in Istanbul, Turkey.

Business 
Demir Sabanci started his business career in Japan and quickly rose to the executive ranks. He began at Toyota City in 1993 working in various executive positions with Mitsui & Co. and Toyota Motor Corporation. He left Japan and moved to the United States to help lead Toyota Motor Sales.

After leaving Toyota, Sabanci rose through the corporate ranks at a number of companies. In 1996, he joined Sabanci Holding as a Board Member and three years later, founded Teknosa, the pioneer electronics retail chain in Turkey. Between 1999-2004, Sabanci held various executive positions in Sabanci Holdings while serving as the President of the Retail Strategic Business Unit that is composed of Carrefoursa, Diasa, and Teknosa. Between 2000 and 2004, he served as founding shareholder and first General Manager and Chairman of Teknosa.

As an entrepreneur and venture capitalist, Sabanci founded and co-founded several companies in Turkey. He is also a founding shareholder and board member of Odesa, Döysa VIP Aviation, and Gratis. On April 9, 2002, Sabanci launched the company Sedes Holding, a Turkish-based firm that specializes in helping launch new business through venture capital; investment management; and real estate investment. He is currently the president and chairman of the board. He also created Sedes Insurance Brokerage and Reinsurance as an additional venture under Sedes Holding.

Education 
Sabanci holds a double major in Economics and International Relations from Boston University. He holds two Masters of Business degrees, one from Cornell University’s Johnson Graduate School of Management and the other from Carnegie Mellon University in Global Business Administration.

Philanthropy and community 
Sabanci is an active philanthropist with organizations such as the Turkish Health & Education Foundation (SEV).

Sabanci is also an Advisory Council Member of Cornell University’s Johnson Business School.

References

External links
  Newspaper Radikal about the sale of his shares 
 Biography in Newspaper Akşam 

Demir Sabanci
1971 births
Turkish businesspeople
Tarsus American College alumni
Boston University School of Management alumni
Cornell University alumni
Living people